Cyrus Diego Jones Jr. (born November 29, 1993) is a former American football cornerback and return specialist of the National Football League (NFL). He played college football at the University of Alabama. He was drafted by the New England Patriots in the second round of the 2016 NFL Draft. He has also played for the Baltimore Ravens and Denver Broncos.

Early years
Jones was born in Baltimore and attended elementary school at the Leith Walk Elementary/Middle School in northeast Baltimore. He played football and baseball in the Northwood neighborhood, also in northeast Baltimore.
Jones attended Gilman School in Baltimore, Maryland. He played cornerback, wide receiver, and running back for the Greyhounds. As a senior, he had 2,365 all-purpose yards and 24 touchdowns on offense and five interceptions on defense. Jones committed to the University of Alabama to play college football.

College career
Jones played at Alabama from 2012 to 2015. Jones played wide receiver as a freshman in 2012, catching four passes for 51 yards. Prior to his sophomore year in 2013, he moved to cornerback. He played in 11 games with five starts that season and had 25 tackles, two interceptions and one sack. As a junior in 2014, he played in all 14 games and had 46 tackles and three interceptions. As a senior, he played in all 15 games and had 37 tackles and two interceptions. He also was Alabama's punt returner, returning 42 punts for 530 yards and four touchdowns. Jones was the Defensive MVP of the 2015 Cotton Bowl after intercepting a redzone pass from Connor Cook with 18 seconds left in the second half to halt Michigan State's momentum and preserve Alabama's eventual 38-0 shutout of the Spartans. In addition, he returned a punt for a touchdown in the victory.

Collegiate statistics

Defensive statistics

Return statistics

Professional career

New England Patriots
Jones was drafted by the New England Patriots in the second round (60th overall) of the 2016 NFL Draft. Jones finished his rookie regular season with seven tackles, no pass deflections, and no interceptions. Jones was an occasional return specialist; his returns gained 180 yards, but he also fumbled five times. He played in 10 games during the regular season. On February 5, 2017, Jones's Patriots appeared in Super Bowl LI. He was inactive for the game as the Patriots defeated the Atlanta Falcons by a score of 34–28 in overtime.

In the Patriots' final preseason game of 2017, Jones suffered a torn ACL and partially torn meniscus and was ruled out for the season. He was officially placed on injured reserve on September 2, 2017.

On September 1, 2018, Jones was waived by the Patriots.

Baltimore Ravens 
On September 3, 2018, Jones was signed to the Baltimore Ravens' practice squad.

New England Patriots (second stint) 
On September 19, 2018, the Patriots re-signed Jones off Baltimore's practice squad. He was waived on October 6, 2018.

Baltimore Ravens (second stint)
On October 8, 2018, Jones was claimed off waivers by the Baltimore Ravens. In Week 12, Jones returned a punt for a 70-yard touchdown in a 34-17 win over the Oakland Raiders, earning him AFC Special Teams Player of the Week. He was released on November 12, 2019.

Denver Broncos
On November 13, 2019, Jones was claimed off waivers by the Denver Broncos. He was placed on the reserve/non-football injury list on November 26, 2019.

Personal life
Jones earned the nickname "Clamp Clampington", which was given for his shutdown corner abilities, while at Alabama.

References

External links

Alabama Crimson Tide bio

1993 births
Living people
Players of American football from Baltimore
American football cornerbacks
American football wide receivers
American football return specialists
Alabama Crimson Tide football players
New England Patriots players
Baltimore Ravens players
Denver Broncos players